Barrettia may refer to:
Barrettia, a plant genus synonymized with Ricinodendron
Barrettia (bivalve)'', a genus of prehistoric mollusks